Archimede Morleo (born 26 September 1983) is an Italian footballer who plays for Eccellenza Apulia club Casarano.

Biography

Lega Pro clubs
Born in Mesagne, Apulia, Morleo started his career at Apulian team Lecce. In the 2002–03 season, he was loaned to Serie C1 club Carrarese. Morleo then spent the 2003–04 Serie C1 season with Sora, and the club bought him on co-ownership deal at the end of season. Sora went bankrupt after the end of the 2004–05 Serie C1 season. Morleo then moved to Cisco Roma of Serie C2.

In 2006, he left for fellow Serie C2 side Catanzaro. In August 2007, he was signed by Serie A side Udinese from Cisco Roma but sold him back to Catanzaro in another co-ownership deal. He missed the first few months of the 2007–08 Serie C2 season due to injury and only played 14 times in Serie C2.

Crotone
In June 2008, Udinese bought him back and re-sold Morleo to Lega Pro Prima Divisione (ex-Serie C1) side Crotone. He won the promotion playoffs in June 2009 with the team and was promoted to Serie B. Crotone also bought the remaining 50% registration rights from Udinese. He started 32 times in the 2009–10 Serie B season as Crotone finished 8th.

Bologna
In July 2010, he was signed by Serie A club Bologna in another co-ownership deal for €400,000.

In June 2011, Bologna acquired Morleo outright for another €550,000.

Bari
After spending seven years with Bologna, he departed the club in the 2017 January transfer window for Serie B side Bari.

References

External links
 Bologna Profile 
 Football.it Profile 
 
 La Gazzetta dello Sport Profile 

1983 births
Living people
Italian footballers
Serie A players
Serie B players
U.S. Lecce players
Atletico Roma F.C. players
U.S. Catanzaro 1929 players
F.C. Crotone players
Bologna F.C. 1909 players
S.S.C. Bari players
Association football fullbacks
Sportspeople from the Province of Brindisi
Footballers from Apulia